Mamuka Lomidze (born 16 June 1984) is  Georgian football player. He is a defender and last played for Dinamo Tbilisi in Georgia.

External links
 Player profile at Dinamo's official web-site
 
 
 

1984 births
Living people
Footballers from Georgia (country)
Georgia (country) youth international footballers
Georgia (country) under-21 international footballers
Association football defenders
FC Dinamo Batumi players
FC Rostov players
FC Sibir Novosibirsk players
FC Zimbru Chișinău players
FC Lokomotivi Tbilisi players
FC Metalurgi Rustavi players
MFK Ružomberok players
FC Dacia Chișinău players
FC Dinamo Tbilisi players
Erovnuli Liga players
Slovak Super Liga players
Expatriate footballers from Georgia (country)
Expatriate footballers in Russia
Expatriate sportspeople from Georgia (country) in Russia
Expatriate footballers in Moldova
Expatriate sportspeople from Georgia (country) in Moldova
Expatriate footballers in Slovakia
Expatriate sportspeople from Georgia (country) in Slovakia